Saint-Siméon, Quebec can refer to:

Saint-Siméon, Gaspésie–Îles-de-la-Madeleine, Quebec, in Bonaventure Regional County Municipality
Saint-Siméon, Capitale-Nationale, Quebec, in Charlevoix-Est Regional County Municipality

See also 
 Saint-Simon, Quebec (disambiguation)